Johannes Joseph "Jan" Hugens (22 March 1939 – 12 March 2011) was a Dutch road cyclist who was active between 1958 and 1968. He won individual stages of the Olympia's Tour in 1958 and 1959 and finished second overall in the Tour of Yugoslavia in 1958. Two years later he qualified for two events at the 1960 Summer Olympics and finished 38th in the individual road race and 4th in the 100 km team time trial. The same year he turned professional, but raced without a team until 1962 when he won two stages of the Tour de l'Avenir. In 1966 he was close to winning the Amstel Gold Race, but finished third after his chain derailed when switching gears near the finish line. He was selected for the Tour de France several times, but every time had to withdraw due to injuries.

After retiring from competitions he worked in road construction and as a school janitor. He died in 2011 of a kidney cancer.

See also
 List of Dutch Olympic cyclists

References

1939 births
2011 deaths
Olympic cyclists of the Netherlands
Cyclists at the 1960 Summer Olympics
Dutch male cyclists
People from Heerlen
Deaths from cancer in the Netherlands
Deaths from kidney cancer
Cyclists from Limburg (Netherlands)